Kwame Amponsah Karikari (born 21 January 1992) is a Ghanaian professional footballer who plays as a striker for Indian Super League club Chennaiyin.

Career

Sweden 
Karikari came to AIK in 2011 and made 18 appearances during the 2011 season, during which he scored on two occasions. Then he was loaned out to Superettan team Degerfors IF during the first half of the 2012 season. During his stay there he made 15 appearances and scored six goals. In August 2012 he was called back to AIK.

As he returned he came to score many vital goals for AIK in their Europa League adventure, he scored against PSV Eindhoven and CSKA Moscow.

Turkey 
For the 2013–14 season, he was loaned to Balıkesirspor, a football club from Balıkesir, Turkey that competes in the TFF First League. In his first 12 matches for the club, he contributed 5 goals and 3 assists as Balıkesirspor topped the table.

Haugesund 
On 3 March 2016, Karikari signed an eighteen-month contract with FK Haugesund.

Irtysh Pavlodar 
On 30 June 2016, FC Irtysh Pavlodar confirmed the signing of Karikari, on loan from FK Haugesund until the end of the 2016 season.

Neftchi Baku 
On 29 June 2018, Karikari signed a two-year contract with Azerbaijan Premier League side Neftçi PFK.

In January 2019, Karikari joined UAE Division One side Al Urooba on loan from Neftçi.

On 15 July 2019, Karikari's contract with Neftçi was terminated by mutual consent.

Dinamo Tbilisi 
On 15 July 2019, Dinamo Tbilisi announced signing of Karikari on a one-year contract, with the option of an additional year.

Career statistics

Club

References

External links 

Fotbolltransfers Profile

1992 births
Living people
Association football forwards
Ghanaian footballers
Ghana under-20 international footballers
Ghanaian expatriate footballers
International Allies F.C. players
AIK Fotboll players
Balıkesirspor footballers
Degerfors IF players
Halmstads BK players
FK Haugesund players
FC Irtysh Pavlodar players
FC Stal Kamianske players
Al-Markhiya SC players
Al-Arabi SC (Qatar) players
Neftçi PFK players
Al Urooba Club players
FC Dinamo Tbilisi players
Hapoel Petah Tikva F.C. players
Superettan players
TFF First League players
Eliteserien players
Allsvenskan players
Kwame Karikari
Ukrainian Premier League players
Qatar Stars League players
Azerbaijan Premier League players
UAE First Division League players
Erovnuli Liga players
Liga Leumit players
Expatriate footballers in Sweden
Expatriate footballers in Turkey
Expatriate footballers in Norway
Expatriate footballers in Kazakhstan
Expatriate footballers in Ukraine
Expatriate footballers in Qatar
Expatriate footballers in Azerbaijan
Expatriate footballers in the United Arab Emirates
Expatriate footballers in Georgia (country)
Expatriate footballers in Israel
Ghanaian expatriate sportspeople in Sweden
Ghanaian expatriate sportspeople in Turkey
Ghanaian expatriate sportspeople in Norway
Ghanaian expatriate sportspeople in Kazakhstan
Ghanaian expatriate sportspeople in Ukraine
Ghanaian expatriate sportspeople in Qatar
Ghanaian expatriate sportspeople in Azerbaijan
Ghanaian expatriate sportspeople in the United Arab Emirates
Ghanaian expatriate sportspeople in Israel